Larak Island (also Lark Island) is an island off the coast of Iran, which has been one of Iran's major oil export points since 1987. The narrowest part of the Strait of Hormuz at distance of  lies between the island and the Omani-owned Quoin Island.

History
During their occupation in the 16th century, the Portuguese built fortresses here, as well as on the nearby Qeshm and Hormuz Islands. The island contains an Iranian military base which maintains several Chinese-made Silkworm HY-2 surface-to-surface missiles placed there in 1987.

A floating terminal was established on Larak Island in June 1986. The island was bombed by Iraq in November and December 1986, as part of the Iran–Iraq War. As part of Operation Praying Mantis, the Iranian frigate Sahand was sunk by the United States Navy, 200 meters southwest of Larak Island. On 14 May 1988, the largest ship at the time, the Liberian supertanker, Seawise Giant, whilst carrying crude Iranian oil, was sunk by Iraqi anti-ship missiles off the coast of Larak Island. The ship was later refloated and repaired.

Demographics
Larak Island is located in the Larak Rural District, which is within the Shahab District. Two settlements are on the island: Larak Shahri and Larak Kuhi. Larak Shahri is the largest of the two villages, with a population of 466 people and 98 families.

Nature
The waters around Larak Island are one of the most diverse coral reef areas in the environment of the Persian Gulf. There are 37 species of scleractinian corals identified around Larak Island.

See also

List of lighthouses in Iran
Bandar Lengeh
Hormozgān

References

External links
 Language of Larak
 Picture of Jazīreh-ye Lārak North Lighthouse

Islands of Iran
Qeshm County
Landforms of Hormozgan Province
Lighthouses in Iran
Strait of Hormuz